Chen Fubin (born January 22, 1978 in Ziyang) is a Chinese slalom canoer who competed in the 2000s. He finished 11th in the C-2 event at the 2004 Summer Olympics in Athens, Greece after being eliminated in the qualifying round.

References

Sports-Reference.com profile

1978 births
Living people
People from Ziyang
Sportspeople from Sichuan
Olympic canoeists of China
Canoeists at the 2004 Summer Olympics
Chinese male canoeists
21st-century Chinese people